Health in Sweden has generally improved over time, with life expectancy increasing, and is at a high level in international comparison. Life expectancy in 2021 was 84.8 years for women and 81.2 years for men and it increased 2.3 years on average from 2006 to 2019. However, the health situation varies between groups in Swedish society and equitable health has proven to be a challenge, with level of education, employment status and country of birth being factors that strongly influence health in the Swedish population. The two leading causes of death in Sweden are cardiovascular disease and cancer.

Infant mortality in Sweden was 2.1 per 1000 living births in 2020, down from 22 per 1000 in 1950.

Health of specific groups in society 
In self-assessments of health, young women indicate a higher level of stress and mild mental health issues compared to other age groups and compared to men. Women without upper secondary education have shown a slightly negative trend in life expectancy from 2006 to 2020.

The COVID-19 pandemic resulted in a decrease in life expectancy of 0.7 years in 2020 compared to 2019, with COVID-19 being the third most common cause of death in Sweden. Older persons, men, and persons born outside of Europe were some of the groups that were overrepresented among COVID-19 cases resulting in serious disease and death in Sweden.

International comparison 
A new measure of expected human capital calculated for 195 countries from 1990 to 2016 and defined for each birth cohort as the expected years lived from age 20 to 64 years and adjusted for educational attainment, learning or education quality, and functional health status was published by The Lancet in September 2018. Sweden had the fifteenth highest level of expected human capital with 24 health, education, and learning-adjusted expected years lived between age 20 and 64 years.

Organisations 
The Public Health Agency of Sweden (Folkhälsomyndigheten) is the government agency responsible for public health including infectious disease, while health care and social services is under the responsibility of Swedish National Board of Health and Welfare (Socialstyrelsen). At the regional level, the 21 regions (formerly county councils) are responsible for financing and providing health care. At the local level, the 290 municipalities are responsible for social welfare services including elderly care as well as for sanitation and various health and environment issues such as food hygiene.

See also
Health care in Sweden
Obesity in Sweden
Suicide in Sweden
COVID-19 pandemic in Sweden

References